The men's 50 kilometres walk at the 2017 World Championships in Athletics was held on a two kilometre course comprising lengths of The Mall between Buckingham Palace and Admiralty Arch on 13 August.

Summary
Four days before the event, three time World Championship medallist, Australia's Jared Tallent was forced to withdraw from the event due to a hamstring injury.

From the start, world record holder, 39 year old Yohann Diniz (FRA) walked with a sense of purpose. Save a silver medal in 2007, the World Championships had resulted in disqualifications and failure for him as had the Olympics. On this course in 2012, Diniz became disoriented and was left by the lead pack lying on the ground after he tripped over a barricade.

From the gun, Diniz walked at his own pace at the front of the pack. He had to make a quick, unplanned pit stop before the 5k mark which brought him back to the pack of some 20 competitors, but really only Horacio Nava (MEX) was able to stay with him for a short while. Again Diniz set sail solo and continued building his lead. 41 seconds at 10k, 1:32 at 15k, 2:10 at 20k, 2:59 by halfway. Reminiscent of last year's Olympics, would his huge lead evaporate into another catastrophe?

Chasing Diniz was a pack of podium suitors that stayed together with individuals falling off the back. By half way it was down to seven, with two Ecudorians; Claudio Villanueva and Andrés Chocho; two Japanese Hirooki Arai and Kai Kobayashi; Aleksi Ojala (FIN); Evan Dunfee (CAN); and Yu Wei (CHN). That group stayed together past 35k, where Diniz had a 4:21 lead. At 36k, the two Japanese teammates took off on their own. In the next 4k, they put 27 seconds on the next challenger Dunfee, while Chocho was disqualified for form violation and asked off the course.

Diniz did not suffer a catastrophe. By the last 2k loop, he had lapped everybody except four walkers. Like his world record three years earlier, Diniz spent the last lap celebrating; tying a French flag around his neck like a bandana, slapping hands with the spectators in the front row. He held the French flag above his head as he crossed the finish line. The two Japanese worked together to keep up the pace, the more experienced Arai finally taking a slight lead for silver, 8:05 behind Diniz. It was the second fastest 50k racewalk of all time, only behind Diniz' world record and the largest margin of victory in World Championship history.

Records
Before the competition records were as follows:

The following records were set at the competition:

Qualification standard
The standard to qualify automatically for entry was 4:06:00.

Results
The final took place on 13 August at 07:46. The results were as follows:

References

50 km walk
Racewalking at the World Athletics Championships